Parosteodes is a monotypic moth genus in the family Geometridae described by Warren in 1895. Its only species, Parosteodes fictiliaria, the dodonaea moth, was first described by Achille Guenée in 1857. It is found in Australia (Lord Howe Island, New South Wales, Queensland, South Australia, Tasmania and Victoria).

The wingspan is about 20 mm.

References

Australian Faunal Directory

Geometridae
Moths of Australia
Moths described in 1857
Taxa named by Achille Guenée
Monotypic moth genera